The White Slave is a 1927 German silent drama film directed by Augusto Genina and starring Liane Haid, Vladimir Gajdarov and Harry Hardt. The film's sets were designed by Otto Erdmann and Hans Sohnle.

Cast
 Liane Haid as Lady Mary Watson, die weiße Sklavin
 Vladimir Gajdarov as Ali Benver Bey
 Harry Hardt as Brefont
 Charles Vanel as Dr. Warner
 Renée Héribel as Fatme, Alis Frau
 Anatol Potock
 Lucille Barns
 Oreste Bilancia
 Nino Ottavi

References

Bibliography
 Grange, William. Cultural Chronicle of the Weimar Republic. Scarecrow Press, 2008.

External links 
 

1927 films
1927 drama films
German drama films
Films of the Weimar Republic
German silent feature films
Films directed by Augusto Genina
Films set in Morocco
German black-and-white films
Silent drama films
1920s German films